The Socialist Party of the People of Ceuta (Spanish: Partido Socialista del Pueblo de Ceuta, abbreviated to PSPC) is a political party in Ceuta, an autonomous city of Spain in north Africa. The PSPC was founded in 1985; amongst its members were defectors from Spanish Socialist Workers' Party and the Communist Party.

A major demand of the PSPC is that Ceuta be made into an Autonomous Community, like other regions of Spain.

The youth wing of the PSPC is called Alternativa 21.

In 2009, the PSPC merged with the Ceutan Democratic Union (UDCE) to form the Caballas Coalition.

External links
 PSPC website
 PSPC election video at YouTube

Political parties in Ceuta
Political parties established in 1985
1985 establishments in Spain
Political parties disestablished in 2009
2009 disestablishments in Spain
Democratic socialist parties in Europe
Socialist parties in Spain
Berbers in Spain